Exidy, Inc. was a developer and manufacturer of coin-operated amusements. The company was founded by H.R. "Pete" Kauffman and Samuel Hawes in 1973. The name "Exidy" was a portmanteau of the words "Excellence in Dynamics".

Notable games released by Exidy include Circus, Death Race, Star Fire, Venture, Pepper II, Mouse Trap, Targ and Spectar.

Game history
Pete Kauffman (1923 – 2015) was a marketing executive at Ramtek in 1972 and was one of several employees of the company who played the original Atari Pong prototype at Andy Capps Tavern in Sunnyvale, California.  Believing coin-operated video games would become a major business, he left Ramtek in late 1973 to establish Exidy with Ampex engineer Samuel Hawes.

Exidy found competing with larger video game companies such as Atari, Inc. difficult. The company's Lila Zinter claimed in 1983 that "Exidy is an innovator, but ... we have a hard time breaking through the politics of getting a game a fair chance."

One of Exidy's efforts aimed at trivia lovers during the 1980s was the quiz game Fax, a multi-level game housed in a large wooden cabinet that stood about 4 feet high and looked nothing like other video games of the time period. The players were shown a series of questions with four possible answers. A point value "clock" ran down to zero after answers were shown, meaning players answering quicker earned more points for their correct answers (Incorrect answers incurred no penalty).

Beginning in 1983, Exidy released a series of light gun games, the first and most well known of which was Crossbow. These presented an unusual twist to the light gun genre: the goal is to protect characters walking through the screen by shooting things which are trying to kill the characters. These games were also the first to feature fully digitized sound for all sound effects and music. Other "C" series games include Cheyenne, Combat, Crackshot, Clay Pigeon and Chiller. Chief designer for these games was Larry Hutcherson. Exidy also made two rarely seen motion cabinet games with vector graphics called Vertigo and Top Gunner. Chief game designer for this game was Vic Tolomei.

Another somewhat successful game from Exidy was a driving game named Top Secret. This game featured a spy car with advanced weaponry on a mission inside the Soviet Union to destroy a heavily guarded Top Secret super weapon. Game designers for this game were Vic Tolomei, Larry Hutcherson and Ken Nicholson.

In 2006, it was announced that Mean Hamster Software acquired rights to develop new Exidy arcade games.

In 2015, CollectorVision Games registered the unused trademark rights to the Exidy name and logo.

Exidy Sorcerer

Under the leadership of visionary Paul Terrell of Byte Shop fame, Exidy made a brief foray into the personal computer market, with the Exidy Sorcerer in 1978.

The Sorcerer was a modified S-100 bus based machine, but lacked the internal expansion system common to other S-100 systems. It made do with an S-100 expansion card-edge that could connect to an external S-100 expansion cage. The Sorcerer also featured an advanced (for the era) text display that was capable of 64 characters per line, when most systems supported only 40 characters. The Sorcerer did not support sound, color, or in some respects, graphics, which seems at odds with the company's video game background; however, the characters it displayed were programmable by the user. The system was never very popular in North America, but found a following in Australia and Europe, notably the Netherlands,  where it was offered with a course on the educational channel TELEAC,  in place of the Belgian DAI computer. Exidy licensed the Sorcerer computer and its software to a Texas-based startup called Dynasty Computer Corporation in 1979. It was relabeled and sold by Dynasty as the Dynasty Smart-Alec.

Arcade titles

First Star Software games
These were licensed from First Star Software in 1984 for use with the Max-A-Flex arcade system.
Astro Chase
Flip and Flop
Bristles
Boulder Dash

Unreleased prototypes
Kreepy Krawlers (1979)
UFO's (1980)
Teeter Torture (1982)
Snapper (1982)
Critter (1995, mechanical gun game)
Hot Shot (1995, mechanical gun game)
Troll (1995, mechanical gun game)

Free titles via MAME
In 2007, the MAME website announced that H.R. Kauffman had released the first of what would become a sizable group of Exidy games downloadable for free, non-commercial use, adding Circus to the already-released Teeter Torture. By 2011, with the help of Reinhard Stompe, the list of ROM images included Circus, Robot Bowl, Car Polo, Side Trak, Ripcord, Fire One, Crash, Star Fire and its unreleased upgrade Star Fire II, Targ, Spectar, Hard Hat, Victory, Teeter Torture, Fax and Top Gunner.

The ROM images may be freely downloaded from the MAME website after the user acknowledges the terms of usage.

References

External links
 Free Exidy arcade ROM downloads at MAME 
 The Dot Eaters Article featuring a history of Death Race and Exidy

Exidy games
American companies established in 1973
Video game companies established in 1973
Defunct video game companies of the United States
Companies based in Sunnyvale, California
Technology companies based in the San Francisco Bay Area